Eric Denton may refer to:

 Eric Denton (soccer) (born 1978), American soccer player
 Sir Eric James Denton (1923–2007), British marine biologist
 Eric Denton (musician), founding member of the early-80s new wave band, The Monroes
Eric Denton (Under the Dome), fictional character